Justice Watkins may refer to:

Lynn B. Watkins(1836–1901), justice of the Louisiana Supreme Court from 1886 to 1901
Samuel Watkins (judge) (fl. 1700s), chief justice of the Leeward Islands in 1706, and from 1716 to c. 1742 
Tasker Watkins (1918–2007), Lord Justice of Appeal and deputy Lord Chief Justice of England and Wales

See also
Judge Watkins (disambiguation)